Topaluşağı can refer to:

 Topaluşağı, Baskil
 Topaluşağı, Maden
 Topaluşağı, Sivrice